Frank Melville Jones, CBE, was an Anglican Colonial Bishop in the first half of the 20th century.

He was born in 1866, educated at the Nelson College and the University of New Zealand and ordained in 1890. After a curacy at  Holy Trinity, Cheltenham he went out to be a CMS Missionary in Onitsha. He was Principal  of the CMS Training College at Oyo In 1919 he became the inaugural Bishop of Lagos, a post he held until 1940. He died on 8 January 1941.

Notes

Anglican bishops of Lagos

20th-century Anglican bishops in Nigeria

People educated at Nelson College

University of New Zealand alumni
Commanders of the Order of the British Empire

1866 births

1941 deaths